Rafael J. Díaz  (born December 12, 1970) is a Mexican professional baseball pitcher who is a free agent.

Díaz attended high school in Bayamón, Puerto Rico. The Cincinnati Reds selected Díaz in the ninth round of the 1989 MLB Draft. He played in Minor League Baseball for the Reds organization in 1989 and 1990 and the Kansas City Royals organization in 1991. He pitched for the Seibu Lions of Nippon Professional Baseball in 2000. In 2012, he played in the Mexican League for the Saraperos de Saltillo. He appeared in the 2009 World Baseball Classic for Mexico.

References

External links

1971 births
Living people
Águilas de Mexicali players
Baseball City Royals players
Baseball players from Chihuahua
Cañeros de Los Mochis players
Generales de Durango players
Gulf Coast Expos players
Mexican expatriate baseball players in Japan
Mexican expatriate baseball players in the United States
Mexican League baseball pitchers
Nippon Professional Baseball pitchers
Pocatello Posse players
Rieleros de Aguascalientes players
Saraperos de Saltillo players
Seibu Lions players
Sportspeople from Ciudad Juárez
Toros de Tijuana players
Venados de Mazatlán players
2009 World Baseball Classic players